Acraea pierrei is a butterfly in the family Nymphalidae. It is found in the Democratic Republic of the Congo (northern Kivu).

Taxonomy
Acraea cabira is a member of the Acraea bonasia species group; see Acraea.
See also Pierre & Bernaud, 2014

References

External links

Images representing  Acraea pierrei at Bold.

Butterflies described in 1981
pierrei
Endemic fauna of the Democratic Republic of the Congo
Butterflies of Africa